Weizhou is a town of Haicheng District, Beihai, Guangxi, People's Republic of China. It includes 2 neighborhood committees, 9 village committees. , it has 2 residential communities (社区) and 9 villages under its administration.

See also 
 List of township-level divisions of Guangxi

References 

Towns of Guangxi
Beihai